The Peel Building is a building at the University of Salford located in their Peel Park campus adjacent to the A6 Crescent and is the university's oldest building in current use.

History

Originally the home for Salford Royal Technical Institute it was opened by the then Duke and Duchess of York (latterly George V and Queen Mary) in 1896. The building was renamed Peel Building in 1967 as the Royal College of Advanced Technology (as it had evolved into) was granted university status.

Listed Building

Like several buildings in the close area such as Salford Museum and Art Gallery and Working Class Movement Library it is Grade II listed.

Present Day

The building still is in use and is currently home to the Universities' School of Environment and Life Sciences.

See also

Listed buildings in Salford, Greater Manchester

References

External links

 University of Salford – official website

University of Salford
Grade II listed buildings in the City of Salford
Buildings and structures completed in 1896